The following is a list of characters are named Yvain (or a variation of Yvain), mentioned in Arthurian legend. The work(s)in which they appear are italicized.

Yvain li filz au roi Uriien; Ywain, Knight of the Round Table (based on the character of Owain mab Urien); Geoffrey of Monmouth's Historia Regum Britanniæ, protagonist in Chrétien de Troyes' Yvain, the Knight of the Lion,  prose Lancelot, Tristan, and Vulgate Suite Merlin
Yvain le Avoutres, Ywain the Bastard, Knight of the Round Table; Gawain's cousin  Erec, Perceval, Suite Merlin, Lancelot, the Spanish Demanda, Tristan
Yvain li filz al roi Herveu; may be the same knight as Hervis/Hernil de Rivel in Prose Lancelot, Vulgate Suite Merlin, Suite Merlin
Yvain as Blanches Mains; Suite Merlin, Tristan, Lancelot, Malroy's Palamedes, Wauchier's Perceval, Demanda
Yvain li Esclains; Lancelot, Suite Merlin
Yvain de Cinel; Prose Lancelot, Suite Merlin, Vulgate Suite Merlin, Demanda
Yvain de Cavaliot; Erec
Yvain le rois de Lindezie; Le Biaus Desconëuz
Yvain li Biaus; Rigomer
Yvain li fiz a la Somiere; Rigomer
Yvain la Noirs; Tristan, Palamedes
Di Blonde Ywein; Torec
Iwan Penelöi; Lanzelet
Ivam de Canelones d'Alamanha; the Portuguese Demanda,
Yvan de Nesguses de Baybola; the Spanish Demanda
Ivains; the leader of the lepers in Béroul's Tristan

References

Ywain